The 2015 Deutschland Cup was the 26th edition of the tournament.

Teams

Standings

Results
All times are local (UTC+1).

References

External links
Official website

2015
Deutschland Cup
Deutschland Cup
November 2015 sports events in Germany